Liederhandschrift, German for Manuscript of the Songs, is the German term for a manuscript containing lieder (songs) of the German Middle Ages, dating from the late 12th to the 15th centuries. Of particular importance are the Minnesang manuscripts of the 13th to 14th centuries.

List of important Liederhandschriften: 
Carmina Burana (clm 4660/4660a), 1230
Kleine Heidelberger Liederhandschrift  (Cpg 357), late 13th century
Codex Manesse  (Cpg  848), ca. 1300
Glogauer Liederbuch, c. 1480
Heidelberger Liederhandschrift  (Cpg 350)
Jenaer Liederhandschrift (Ms. El. f. 101), early 14th century
Weingartner Liederhandschrift or Stuttgarter Liederhandschrift (Cod. HB XIII 1), early 14th century
Augsburger Liederbuch (Cgm 379)
Bechsteins Handschrift (Cod. 14 A 39)
Fichards Liederbuch (lost)
Liederhandschrift of Martin Ebenreuter (Ms. germ. fol. 488)
Lochamer-Liederbuch (Ms. Mus. 40613 Berlin, and  Cgm 5249/76 Munich), mid 15th century
Kolmarer Liederhandschrift (Cgm 4997), ca. 1460
Königsteiner Liederbuch (mgq 719), ca. 1470
Liederhandschrift of Clara Hätzlerin (Ms. 1709)
Palmsche Handschrift (Ms. germ. quart. 1107)
Rostocker Liederbuch (Mss. phil. 100/2), 1478

See also
Lai
Minnesang
Roman de Fauvel

Minnesang
Medieval manuscripts
Medieval music manuscript sources